Bulldog Mansion is a South Korean pop rock band from Seoul formed in 1999. Their name does not translate to "Bulldog Mansion"; rather, it is a phonetic approximation in Hangul, with the English name being used for their website and album art.  They are most well known in the English-speaking world for their song, "Happy Birthday to Me" featured in the SamBakZa Flash cartoon "There she is!! Step 2 -- Cake Dance".

The group is currently under hiatus as Lee Han-Chul pursues his solo career and projects.

Discography

Studio albums

Extended plays

References

External links 
 There She Is!! Step 2 - Cake Dance
 Bulldog Mansion at MusicBrainz

South Korean pop rock music groups
Musical groups established in 1999
K-pop music groups
1999 establishments in South Korea